Hoof glue is a form of animal glue made by boiling down the hooves of ungulates into partially hydrolyzed keratin. It is not to be confused with hide glue.

History 
Hoof glue applications include  stiffening bow strings, adhering fabric to wood, stiffening fabric, and sealing glass window frames and ceramic containers. Hoof glue is still used today in cabinetry and other fine woodworking projects where the joints must be capable of disassembly.

Formulation 
The general process is to take the hooves of ungulates and break them into small chunks and then boil them in water until all the hoof material has been liquefied. An acid is then added to create a thick gel. The resultant product is then cooled and allowed to harden.  Once melted, it is necessary to heat the glue substance until it is the required consistency – thin hoof glue can be used to stiffen fabrics; thicker glue is used in cabinetry.

Usage 
The storable form of hoof glue is a hard block of resin-like material. To use it one would break off a suitably sized chunk and mix it with hot water and allow it to melt. Once melted it can be simmered to reduce to the appropriate thickness and then applied to the object in question. Very thin glue can be used as a coating to stiffen and strengthen cordage, such as chair backs and seats. Hoof glue is not waterproof, it can be dissolved by water, so moisture or even high humidity will affect it.  But hoof glue does not become brittle when dry; it retains some flexibility, thus making it ideal for applications where some give in the joint or covering is required.

See also
Adhesives
Gelatin
Neatsfoot oil
Knacker
Rendering (animal products)

References 

Adhesives
Woodworking adhesives
Horse products
Equine hoof